Fort Plains may refer to:

Fort Plains, New Jersey
Fort Plain, New York